Rosa Neuenschwander (1883-1962) was a Swiss feminist who was a pioneer in vocational education and counseling.

Biography
Neuenschwander was born in Brienz, Switzerland, on 3 April 1883. She became the first vocational counselor in Bern. She was instrumental in founding several social projects to benefit women and youths. Neuenschwander organized the first exhibition on women's work in Bern in 1923, which she expanded into the Swiss Exhibition for Women's Work(SAFFA), in 1928.

The most important organizations she founded were the Schweizerische Frauengewerbeverband and the Schweizerische Landfrauenverband or SLFV (Swiss Country Association for Women Suffrage).

She died on 20 December 1962 in Bern, Switzerland.

Works

References 

1883 births
People from Brienz
1962 deaths
Swiss suffragists
Swiss feminists
Swiss educators
Women educators